Capital punishment was abolished in Madagascar in 2015. Madagascar last executed in 1958. Prior to de jure abolition, Madagascar was classified as "Abolitionist in Practice."

Madagascar signed the Second Optional Protocol to the International Covenant on Civil and Political Rights on 24 Sep 2012 and ratified it on 21 Sep 2017.

References 

Madagascar
Law of Madagascar